Chalhoub is an Arabic surname of primarily Levantine origin. Notable people include:

Aida Chalhoub (born 1951), Lebanese singer
Claude Chalhoub (born 1974), Lebanese musician
Michel Chalhoub (1931–2021), French billionaire
Michel Soto Chalhoub, civil engineer 
Omar Sharif (1932–2015), Egyptian actor (born Michel Yusef Dimitri Chalhoub)

See also
Shalhoub

Arabic-language surnames